Yakshadeshaya is an upcoming Sri Lankan Sinhala epic biographical film directed by Sugath Samarakoon. It stars  Roger Seneviratne in lead roles along with Wasantha Kumaravila . Music composed by Shan Gunawardena.

Production
The maiden casting session for the film was held at the Sudarshi Hall at Bauddhaloka Mawatha on 10 June 2018. Muhurath ceremony was held at the Tharangani Hall of National Film Corporation building.

Plot
The storyline revolve around direct descendants of the Siu Hela tribes (four ethnic tribes) who are found among the Vedda community where a young educated youth start to discover their genealogical truth.

Cast
 Roger Seneviratne as Randuna
 Harini Kawyanjani Perera as Gomari
 Wasantha Kumaravila
 Buddhadasa Vithanarachchi
 Anura Dharmasiriwardena
 Sugath Wijesekara
 Rinsley Weeraratne

References

Sinhala-language films
Films set in the Pre Anuradhapura period